Maya the Bee (promoted theatrically as Maya the Bee Movie) is a 2014 computer-animated comedy adventure film directed by Alexs Stadermann, loosely based on the 1975 anime Maya the Bee as well as indirectly the German children's book The Adventures of Maya the Bee by Waldemar Bonsels. It features the voices of Coco Jack Gillies, Kodi Smit-McPhee, Noah Taylor, Richard Roxburgh, Jacki Weaver, Justine Clarke, The Umbilical Brothers, and Miriam Margolyes.

Maya the Bee was released theatrically on 4 September 2014. The film received mixed reviews from critics, but grossed $29.6 million worldwide. Two sequels to Maya the Bee were released; The Honey Games in 2018 and The Golden Orb in 2021.

Summary

Freshly hatched bee Maya is a little whirlwind and simply won't follow the rules of the hive. One of the rules, of course, she is not allowed to trust the other bugs, especially the hornets, that live beyond a camp in the meadow. But cute sweet little Maya can't help but make friends with all kinds of other bugs, including a violin-playing grasshopper, a dung beetle and even a young hornet named Sting, who has a hatred of bees.

Voice cast
 Coco Jack Gillies as Maya, a young bee girl.
 Kodi Smit-McPhee as Willy, a young bee boy, Maya's best friend.
 Joel Franco as Sting, a young hornet, Maya and Willy's best friend and sidekick.
 Richard Roxburgh as Flip, a grasshopper.
 Justine Clarke as Miss Cassandra, a teacher at the bee school and Maya's mother at heart.
 Jacki Weaver as Buzzlina Von Beena, the royal counselor of the beehive, Maya's arch-enemy.
 Andy McPhee as Hank, the leader of hornets, Sting's father, Bees friends, and former arch-rivals.
 Miriam Margolyes as The Queen, the mother of Bees.
 David Collins as Arnie, an ant soldier, Paul's right-hand.
 Shane Dundas as Barney, an ant soldier, Arnie's partner and Paul's right-hand.
 Jimmy James Eaton as Paul, an ant colonel, the leader of ants.
 Heather Mitchell as The Nurse, chief of the worker bees.
 Noah Taylor as Crawley, the hilariously bumbling of the beehive, The Queen's loyal assistant and Buzzlina's former henchman.
 Cameron Ralph as Momo, a moth.
 Glenn Fraser as Kurt, a dung beetle.
 Heather Mitchell as Thekla, a stubborn spider.
 Stavroula Mountzouris as Lara, a ladybug who is Willy's love interest.
 Sam Haft as Drago, a dragonfly.

Production

Animation World Network announced in May 2013 that Universum Film would distribute all German rights of the film. The film is directed by Alexs Stadermann, and produced by Patrick Elmendorff and Thorsten Wegener from Studio 100 Animation in Munich; Jim Ballantine and Barbara Stephen from Buzz Studios in Sydney. The film was produced in association with Flying Bark Productions and the channel ZDF. This film was Coco Jack Gillies film debut as she voiced the role of Maya. Gillies was 9 years old at the time of production.

Reception
Maya the Bee received mixed reviews from critics, scoring a 47% in Rotten Tomatoes with an average rating of 5.59/10 from seventeen reviews. Frank Hatherley from Screen Daily stated that "this merry movie is for young children, mainly girls (Note that this is an educated opinion): step aside, Dora the Explorer!" with vivid colours and plenty of unthreatening action.

Accolades

Sequel

See also
 Maya the Honey Bee

Notes

References

External links

 Official US website
 Official UK website
 Official German website
 
 

2014 fantasy films
2014 3D films
2014 animated films
2014 films
Animated comedy films
Australian animated feature films
Australian comedy films
Australian fantasy films
Australian children's animated films
Australian children's comedy films
Australian children's adventure films
Australian children's fantasy films
Australian computer-animated films
2010s Australian animated films
2010s German animated films
2010s children's animated films
2010s children's comedy films
2010s children's fantasy films
2010s children's adventure films
Animated films about insects
Animated films about friendship
German animated films
German children's films
German comedy films
German fantasy films
Films produced by Jim Ballantine
Films directed by Alexs Stadermann
3D animated films
2014 comedy films
Fictional ants
Fictional grasshoppers
Films about bees
Films about royalty
Screen Australia films
StudioCanal animated films
Flying Bark Productions films
Maya the Bee
2010s English-language films
2010s Australian films
2010s German films